John Hewet may refer to:

John Hewet (MP) 1413 and 1422, MP for Leicester
Sir John Hewet, 1st Baronet (c. 1598-1657), of the Hewet baronets
Sir John Hewet, 2nd Baronet (died 1684), of the Hewet baronets
Sir John Hewet, 3rd Baronet (died 1737), of the Hewet baronets

See also
John Hewitt (disambiguation)
John Hewett (disambiguation)
John Huwet, a Member of Parliament for Devizes, Wiltshire in 1406